The Lloyd Erskine Sandiford Centre (formerly known as the Sherbourne Conference Centre) is a conference centre facility on the Caribbean island of Barbados. Owned by the government of Barbados and managed by the government agency Barbados Conference Services Limited (BCSL), the Lloyd Erskine Sandiford Centre is just outside the capital city of Bridgetown, in St. Michael.

Facility 

When first constructed the building was considered too large by members of the opposition and construction on back portion of the facility halted just after a change in government. Many Calypsonians sung about the side of the facility (which contained a planned performing arts centre) as being "unfinished" or stating the facility had its "backside exposed". After a change in government in 2008, the semi-completed ~15-year-old auditorium was torn down to make way for office space and a carpark instead. This action was much to the condemnation of the former prime minister that spearheaded it, Sir Lloyd Erskine Sandiford.

Annual events 
Barbados Manufacturers' Exhibition (BMEX)
Caribbean Consumer Conference
Home Show

Past major events 
The UN Global Conference on Sustainable Development for Small Island States
The Caribbean Tourism Conference (CTC-20)
The CARICOM Heads of Government Conference
The US-CARICOM summit between US president Bill Clinton and the CARICOM heads of government
Organization of American States (OAS)
The UN World Conference Against Racism - African and African Descendants World Conference Against Racism.
 2020 State Opening of second session of Parliament.
 UNCTAD-15 (2021)

Awards 
 2003, 2004, 2005, 2006, 2008, 2009 - The "Caribbean's Leading Conference Centre" - by the World Travel Awards

Naming 
On 24 October 2008, the facility's original name of Sherbourne Conference Centre was changed to its present name in honour of Lloyd Erskine Sandiford, a former prime minister of Barbados.

Notes

References

External links
 

1994 establishments in Barbados
Buildings and structures completed in 1994
Convention centres in Barbados
Event venues established in 1994
Saint Michael, Barbados
Tourism in Barbados
Tourist attractions in Barbados